"Losses" is a song by American Lil Tjay, released on October 30, 2020. It is the lead single and a bonus track from his second studio album Destined 2 Win (2020). The song was produced by Woodpecker. An accompanying music video of the song was directed by Shomi Patwary.

Composition and lyrics
In the song, Lil Tjay reflects his struggles in his past life and what he has learned from them, and promises to improve himself and not let them control his future ("Can't change, I remember what I been through / So when I spit no need for pencils / Traumatized, shit be fucking with my mental / I seen some shit I can't get into / I'm just tryna be somebody influential / A lot of souls I could vent to / My success is not something coincidental").

Charts

References

2020 singles
2020 songs
Lil Tjay songs
Columbia Records singles
Songs written by Lil Tjay